Big Foot Airfield,  is a privately owned public use airport located  west of the central business district of Walworth, a village in Walworth County, Wisconsin, United States.

Although most airports in the United States use the same three-letter location identifier for the FAA and International Air Transport Association (IATA), this airport is assigned 7V3 by the FAA but has no designation from the IATA.

Facilities and aircraft 
It has one runway: 18/36 is 2,108 by 100 feet (643 x 30 m) with a turf surface.

For the 12-month period ending May 5, 2021, the airport had 4,000 aircraft operations, an average of 77 per week; all general aviation. In January 2023, there were 12 aircraft based at this airport: all 12 single-engine.

See also
 List of airports in Wisconsin

References

External links 

Airports in Wisconsin
Airports in Walworth County, Wisconsin